The year 1811 in archaeology involved some significant events.

Explorations

Excavations
 Colosseum, Rome: The arena substructure is partly excavated during 1810-1814.
 In Italy, detailed excavations continue at Pompeii.
 The remains of the villa of Pliny, named Villa di Pino, are excavated during 1802-1819 (following the excavations of 1713).
 The Bignor Roman Villa is excavated between 1811 and 1819.

Publications

Births
 Christian Maclagan, Scottish antiquary (d. 1901)

Deaths

See also
 Roman Forum - excavations.

References

Archaeology
Archaeology by year
Archaeology
Archaeology